The Dangerous Woman Tour was the third concert tour and the second arena tour by American singer Ariana Grande in support of her third studio album, Dangerous Woman (2016). It traveled across North America, Europe, Latin America, Asia and Oceania. The tour started on February 3, 2017 in Phoenix, Arizona, and ended on September 21, 2017 in Hong Kong. The tour was temporarily halted on May 22, 2017 due to a terrorist bombing, which happened minutes after the end of Grande's Manchester Arena show, killing 22 concert-goers (excluding the perpetrator) and physically injuring 139 others. After organizing and performing at the One Love Manchester benefit concert, Grande resumed the tour on June 7, 2017 in Paris, France.

On November 29, 2018, Grande released a four-part docu-series on YouTube titled Dangerous Woman Diaries that included behind-the-scenes footage from the tour, performances as well as the creation of her fourth studio album, Sweetener (2018).

Background
On May 23, 2016, Ariana Grande announced on social media that she would go on tour starting in late 2016 or early 2017 and that fans who ordered her album before May 25 would get a code to purchase tickets before the general public sale. On September 9, 2016, Grande released the dates for the first leg of the tour, beginning on February 3, 2017. Ticket pre-sales for the first leg began on September 20, and general ticket sales began on September 24, 2016. European tour dates were announced on October 20, 2016 for May and June 2017.

On September 22, 2016, Grande announced on Twitter that Victoria Monét and Little Mix would be joining the tour as opening acts throughout the North American leg of the tour. On September 26, 2016, Grande announced that the tour would visit New Zealand and Australia. Bia joined the tour as the opening act for the Europe dates. Grande also scheduled dates in Latin America for June and July 2017, in Oceania for September 2017, and in Asia for August and September 2017, including in Singapore as part of the F1 Grand Prix.

Costume design
For the show's visual, Grande worked with her stylist Law Roach and designer Bryan Hearns, creating a more "mature" and "growth" look for Grande. Describing the concept of the outfits used during the shows, Hearns stated: "It's about making an adult Ariana, marrying her silhouette with what's happening in fashion right now, so a big theme is sportswear—everything is oversized, there are straps everywhere, and cool hardware ... It's definitely more edgy, it's more adult, but still playful and young." Talking about the opening look, a high-neck black bodysuit, with a flirty skirt on top, he revealed that the look was designed one day before of the first show. He explained: "I slept for four hours. It was stressful, but it was exciting. It was awesome." The look was inspired by Audrey Hepburn.  During an interview with Billboard, Hearns said:

Most of the looks are my direct aesthetic, so I put my stamp on it. It was just a certain silhouette that she wanted and certain colors, and that's how we met in the middle. We had a couple of looks that were in her silhouette, which is usually high-waisted bodysuits, shorts, skirts and crop tops. It's very flattering on her so we have a lot of items in that shape.

He also revealed that "everything was a mixture of leather, denim, strappy fabrics and hardware." "We use a lot of sweatshirt fabric because everything is very relaxed-looking. It doesn’t have a lot going on in terms of the details." The look styled by Grande during the fourth act of the show, a crop-top with blue denim harem pants, was inspired by 90s styles (mainly the R&B group TLC).

Concert synopsis
Ten minutes and fifty seconds before the show started, a countdown timer and video projected on a giant curtain placed at the back of the stage showing Grande and two of her dancers and close friends, Brian Nicholson and Scott Nicholson. After the end of the countdown, ten dancers emerged onstage followed by Grande, who wore a black dress and black high heeled boots. The curtain drops to show a wider screen as the show began with "Be Alright". Grande sang while performing in a vogue-style choreography, while dancers, dressed in black costumes, move around her dancing vogue-like actions. After the song, Grande puts on a jacket and performed "Everyday" as red lights dimmed the stage to a background of pyrotechnics. During the performance, the rapper Future appeared in the projected video singing his verse. Next was "Bad Decisions", with elevated platforms and Grande's dancers around her. "Let Me Love You" followed, on a stage dimly lit by blue and white lights. Grande exited the stage laying down on an elevated platform that then descended under the stage. The song transitioned into an orchestral string interlude followed by a video of Grande, with a purple, blue and pink aura around her, singing the unreleased intro for the original version of "Dangerous Woman" (formerly titled Moonlight), titled "Baby Loves", that did not appear on the retail release.

The second part of the show began with an extended version of “Knew Better” with Grande and her dancers dressed in street-style white clothes, followed by a shortened version of “Forever Boy”, featuring colorful stage effects while Grande walks down the catwalk towards the front of the stage. Once there at the front of the stage, Grande then performed a stripped-down version of "One Last Time", which transitioned back into the original version of the song. After that was R&B-inspired song “Touch It”. Stage projections and visual effects were shown as Grande walks the catwalk and makes her way back towards the main part of the stage and stands atop an elevated platform. Grande concluded the second part of the show singing "Leave Me Lonely" with light laser lighting effects. After the end of the song, an extended version of the song played as Grande exits and goes backstage for a costume change, and a backing band (guitars, drums, bass and keyboards) arrived onstage.

The third part of the show started with a second interlude on the video screen, showing Grande in blonde hair and a leotard posing provocatively as feminist words are displayed, including "empowered", "grounded", "not asking for it" (which repeats multiple times), "raw", "gentle", "sensual", "sexual", "human" and "female". Grande then ascended to the stage wearing a gray bra and a skirt with straps, while her dancers rode stationary bicycles on a platform to perform "Side to Side". The stage transformed into a gymnasium with lockers, benches and a chinning bar. Rapper Nicki Minaj was shown on the video screen in scenes from the official music video during her verse. Grande then performed a remixed version of "Bang Bang" with colorful and extreme strobe lighting and laser effects. Next, during "Greedy", fake money with Grande's face on it fell onto the audience. Starting with the second leg in Europe, the song then swiftly transitioned into "Focus", during which the screen showed scenes from the music video. Grande ended the third part of the show with “I Don't Care“ and exited as the band played an extended outro for the song.

The fourth part of the show started with Grande returning to the catwalk area of the stage wearing a bra and a pair of denim harem pants with black high heel shoes (a brown jumpsuit dress with a moon on it wearing white high heel shoes during the Europe leg onwards) and singing "Moonlight" as she sat and knelt on the edge of the catwalk in front of a celestial background with celestial projections. Next was "Love Me Harder" and a reworked version of "Break Free" with laser effects around the stage. Grande then talks to the audience for a bit and then performed ”Sometimes”. While performing, pink balloons fell from the ceiling as Grande continues to interact with the audience. This is followed by "Thinking Bout You" as the video screen showed coloured silhouettes of opposite-sex couples and same-sex couples making out. There ensued an optional interchangeable section of the concert, which featured anything from Ariana singing the original version of "Honeymoon Avenue", to Ariana singing a cover of Pink + White by Frank Ocean (this was changed to Grande performing "Somewhere Over The Rainbow" after performing "Thinking Bout You" starting with the show in Paris, France after the Manchester Arena Bombing). After the interchangeable section came "Problem" with the stage dimmed to blue lights while the dancers carried big blue neon glow sticks, followed by "Into You", which concluded the main set. For the encore, after a two-minute silence, Grande performed "Dangerous Woman", wearing a black latex dress, with red lighting and pyrotechnics on the stage. After performing, Grande thanks the audience and exits the stage as the band played an extended outro of the song.

Critical response
The Dangerous Woman Tour received mostly positive reviews. For example, in a review for Las Vegas Weekly, Ian Caramanzana wrote: "Grande's burly, soulful vibrato and wide range remain the star of her show, and she's at her best when it's just her, a microphone and her band – especially when she performs ballads". Ed Masley commented for The Arizona Republic that Grande has grown "into a self-assured R&B diva with the vocal chops to back up the confident swagger she brought to the stage. ... Vocally, Grande exuded more power and passion than ever, especially on the ballads". Jon Pareles of The New York Times praised Grande for not resorting to shock value. He described the concert as "a show of confidence, prowess and aplomb. ... Onstage, Ms. Grande ... flaunts professionalism, not skin or profanities". Billboard'''s Kristin Corpuz said of Grande's performance at Madison Square Garden: "She's showing off a more mature sound and edgier image. With outfits custom-made by celebrity fashion designer Bryan Hearns, Grande electrified the Madison Square Garden stage with her four-piece rhythm section and 10 backup dancers." A Billboard report later commented of the last concert of the tour that Grande "more than delivered with her impressive vocal range, sultry dance moves, unstoppable energy and a whirl of costume changes. ... [Through her tour,] Grande has brought people together through music to love and support each other."

In a more mixed review, Chris Kelly of The Washington Post thought that "her gorgeous four-octave soprano was often obscured by her bass-heavy backing band", but he described the show as "a pristine showcase of her immense vocal talent." Dan Hyman of Chicago Tribune opined, "[A]side from a massive projection screen that lived behind the stage and stretched the width of the arena, the production seemed a bit cheap for a show of this scale. ... But it doesn't matter for this gifted singer: all Grande needs do to ... is dial back the bass and belt out some of her magnificent vocal runs."

Manchester Arena bombing

On May 22, 2017, after Grande's show at Manchester Arena in England finished, a shrapnel bomb explosion caused the death of 22 concert-goers and more than 800 injuries. Grande cancelled subsequent tour dates through June 5. Grande organised a benefit concert, One Love Manchester, which took place on June 4 at the Old Trafford Cricket Ground in Manchester, to aid the bombing victims and affected families. By the end of the concert, it had raised £17 million. Grande also re-released her previous single, "One Last Time" and a live cover of her singing "Somewhere Over the Rainbow", with all funds going to the British Red Cross. Various artists joined Grande for the concert. Alfredo Flores, Grande's tour photographer, told Refinery 29'' that, after the bombing:

Set list
This set list is representative of the February 3, 2017, show in Phoenix. It is not intended to represent all concerts for the duration of the tour.

"Be Alright"
"Everyday"
"Bad Decisions" 
"Let Me Love You" 
"Knew Better / Forever Boy"
"One Last Time"
"Touch It"
”Leave Me Lonely"
"Side to Side"
"Bang Bang" 
"Greedy"
"I Don't Care"
"Moonlight"
"Love Me Harder" 
"Break Free"
"Sometimes"
"Thinking Bout You"
"Problem" 
"Into You"
Encore
"Dangerous Woman"

Notes
During the shows in Las Vegas and Omaha, Grande performed a cover of Frank Ocean's "Pink + White".
During the show in Tulsa, Grande performed the original version of "Honeymoon Avenue".
During the show in Uncasville and the first show in New York City, Grande performed "Better Days" with Victoria Monét.
During the shows in Manchester and Buffalo on February 19 and 21, Grande performed "Esta Noche" with BIA.
During the second show in New York City, Grande performed "Jason's Song (Gave It Away)" with Jason Robert Brown.
During the show in Inglewood and the third performance in Chiba, Grande performed "The Way" with Mac Miller.
Starting with the show in Stockholm, "Focus" was added to the set list.
During the shows in Stockholm, Amsterdam and Dublin, Grande performed "Quit". During the second show in Amsterdam, the song was performed with Cashmere Cat.
Starting with the show in Paris, "Somewhere Over the Rainbow" was added to the set list.
During the show in Paris, Grande performed "Dang!" and "The Way" with Mac Miller.
During the show in Singapore at the 2017 Singapore Grand Prix, "Knew Better", "Forever Boy", "Touch It", "Moonlight", "Sometimes", "Thinking Bout You" and "Problem" were not performed.

Shows

Cancelled shows

Notes

References

External links

Official Instagram account for the Dangerous Woman Tour

2017 concert tours
Ariana Grande concert tours
Concert tours of North America
Concert tours of the United States
Concert tours of Canada
Concert tours of Mexico
Concert tours of Europe
Concert tours of the United Kingdom
Concert tours of Oceania
Concert tours of Australia
Concert tours of New Zealand
Concert tours of South America
Concert tours of Asia
Concert tours of South Korea
Concert tours of Japan